20 Mule Team (also known as Twenty Mule Team) is a 1940 American Western film about Death Valley, and Daggett, California borax miners, directed by Richard Thorpe and starring Wallace Beery, Marjorie Rambeau and Anne Baxter. The film provides an extremely rare opportunity to see Beery act opposite his nephew Noah Beery Jr., best known for playing Joseph "Rocky" Rockford on television's The Rockford Files starring James Garner during the 1970s. The film was originally released in Sepiatone, a brown and white process used by the studio the previous year for the Kansas scenes in The Wizard of Oz.

Plot
In 1892 Death Valley, California, dwindling borax deposits have the Desert Borax Company at the brink of bankruptcy.  The company is unable to pay its transport drivers, the 20 mule teams that haul the borax across the desert.  Skinner Bill is one of the mule team drivers.  Without pay, he's unable to pay his rent.  Josie Johnson, owner of the Furnace Flat saloon, puts Bill out.

Stag Roper arrives in town and persuades the bank to extend the borax company's credit, hoping to discover more borax.  Stag learns that Bill has found borax crystals from Chuckwalla, who died in the desert.  Stag knows Bill is wanted for murder and blackmails him to help get Chuckwalla's claim.  Bill agrees, and the next day sets out with Pete to locate the claim.  Chuckwalla's partner was Mitch, and a shootout ensues as he tries to protect his claim.

Josie's daughter Jean plans to elope with Stag, but Josie locks her in her room and confronts Stag.  He shoots Josie, after which he and his partner, Salters, ride off to steal Mitch's claim.

Bill and Pete head after Stag, and find Mitch unconscious in the desert.  Following a shootout with Stag, Bill puts Mitch on his mule  and sends him back to town.

Mitch marries Josie, and they move to Los Angeles.

Cast
Wallace Beery as Skinner Bill
Leo Carrillo as Piute Pete
Marjorie Rambeau as Josie Johnson
Anne Baxter as Joan Johnson
Douglas Fowley as Stag Roper
Noah Beery Jr. as Mitch
Arthur Hohl as Salters
Clem Bevans as Chuckawalla
Charles Halton as Henry Adams
Minor Watson as Marshal

See also
 List of American films of 1940

References

External links

 Fandango entry 

1940 films
1940 Western (genre) films
American black-and-white films
1940s English-language films
Films directed by Richard Thorpe
Films set in California
Metro-Goldwyn-Mayer films
American Western (genre) films
Films with screenplays by Richard Maibaum
Films about mining
1940s American films